The Malvern Commercial Historic District encompasses the historic commercial heart of Malvern, Arkansas.  The  district extends along three blocks of South Main Street, between 2nd and 5th Streets.  This area was mostly developed after fires devastated the city's downtown in 1896 and 1897, and before 1925, and includes Malvern City Hall.  Most of the historic buildings are one and two-story brick buildings in commercial styles of the period.

The district was listed on the National Register of Historic Places in 2015.

See also
National Register of Historic Places listings in Lawrence County, Arkansas

References

Historic districts on the National Register of Historic Places in Arkansas
Buildings and structures in Malvern, Arkansas
National Register of Historic Places in Hot Spring County, Arkansas